Death in a Strange Country (1993) is the second novel in Donna Leon's Commissario Brunetti mysteries set in Venice and the sequel to Death at La Fenice (1992).

Plot summary
Early one morning Brunetti is confronted with the body of a young American serviceman fished out of a fetid Venetian canal. All clues point to a mugging, but robbery seems too convenient a motive. Then something incriminating is found in the dead man's flat, and Brunetti becomes convinced that somebody is taking great pains to provide an easy solution to the crime.
When he uncovers collusion between U.S. bases abroad and international business interests involved in toxic waste disposal, he exposes the sinister face of the military-industrial complex. Add to this the corruption of Italian politics, and the reader sees Brunetti rendered helpless in the face of evil. Only a vengeful Sicilian mother can bring a bit of justice to the world Leon has created.

Adaptations
Death in a Strange Country  was adapted for television in 2006 by Teamworx Produktion GmbH as Endstation Venedig, part of its Commissario Brunetti Mysteries series, starring Uwe Kockisch as Guido Brunetti.

References

External links
Death in a Strange Country at italian-mysteries.com

1993 American novels
Novels by Donna Leon
Novels set in Venice
American novels adapted into television shows